The following are the national records in athletics in Eswatini (formerly Swaziland) maintained by Eswatini's national athletics federation: Athletics Eswatini (AE).

Outdoor

Key to tables:

h = hand timing

A = affected by altitude

OT = oversized track (> 200m in circumference)

Men

Women

Indoor

Men

Women

References
General
World Athletics Statistic Handbook 2019: National Outdoor Records
World Athletics Statistic Handbook 2018: National Indoor Records
Specific

External links

Eswatini
Records
Athletics